The Zabriskie Quartzite is a Cambrian Period geologic formation of the northern Mojave Desert, in Inyo County, California and Nye County, Nevada.

It is named for its occurrence at Zabriskie Point, located on the eastern slopes of Death Valley in Death Valley National Park.

Geology
The lower unit is defined by the Resting Springs Member, the upper unit by the Emigrant Pass Member.

It overlies the Wood Canyon Formation, and underlies the Carrara Formation.

Fossils
It preserves fossils dating back to the Lower Cambrian period of the Paleozoic Era.

See also

 
 List of fossiliferous stratigraphic units in California
 Paleontology in California

References

Cambrian California
Cambrian geology of Nevada
Geology of Inyo County, California
Natural history of the Mojave Desert
Death Valley National Park
Quartzite formations
Cambrian System of North America
Geologic formations of California
Geologic formations of Nevada